Fort Mitchell Site may refer to:

Fort Mitchell Historic Site, in Fort Mitchell, Alabama, an archeological site listed on the National Register of Historic Places in Russell County, Alabama
Fort Mitchell Heights Historic District, Fort Mitchell, Kentucky, listed on the National Register of Historic Places in Kenton County, Kentucky
Old Fort Mitchell Historic District, Fort Mitchell, Kentucky, listed on the National Register of Historic Places in Kenton County, Kentucky
Fort Mitchell Site (Scottsbluff, Nebraska), listed on the National Register of Historic Places in Scotts Bluff County, Nebraska